There are a number of IPC World Championships supervised and co-ordinated by the International Paralympic Committee (IPC):
IPC Alpine Skiing World Championships
IPC Athletics World Championships
IPC Biathlon and Cross-Country Skiing World Championships
IPC Cycling World Championships
IPC Ice Sledge Hockey World Championships
IPC Powerlifting World Championships
IPC Shooting World Championships
IPC Swimming World Championships
IPC Wheelchair Dance Sport World Championships